Gian Singh may refer to:

 Giani Gian Singh Nihang (19th century), Indian Sikh scholar
 Gian Singh Naqqash (1883–1953), Indian Punjabi artist
 Gian Singh Rarewala (1901–1979), Indian politician
 Gian Singh (soldier) (1920–1996), British Indian Army soldier
 Gian Singh (field hockey) (1928–2004), Malaysian sportsperson
 Gian Singh (wrestler) (born 1959), Indian sportsperson